Cryptorhynchus elegans is a species of weevils in the subfamily Cryptorhynchinae. It is found in North America.

References

External links 
 

Cryptorhynchinae
Beetles described in 1831